A boomerang is a curved wooden throwing implement.

Boomerang may also refer to:

Aircraft
 CAC Boomerang, an Australian-designed and built fighter aircraft in World War 2
 Fisher Boomerang, a US-designed and built ultralight aircraft
 Gin Boomerang, a South Korean paraglider design
 Scaled Composites Boomerang, an unconventional twin engine aircraft designed by Burt Rutan
 Schneider ES-60 Boomerang, an Australian-designed and built glider
 Whitney Boomerang, an Australian-designed and built training aircraft
 Boomerang, a de Havilland DH.88 Comet aircraft

Entertainment

Comics
 Boomerang (comics), a Marvel Comics supervillain
 Captain Boomerang, a DC Comics supervillain and enemy of the Flash

Films
 The Boomerang (1919 film), an American drama directed by Bertram Bracken
 The Boomerang (1925 film), an American comedy drama film directed by Louis J. Gasnier
 Boomerang (1934 film), a British drama directed by Arthur Maude
 Boomerang! (1947 film), by Elia Kazan
 Boomerang (1966 film), about Polish-German love after World War II (also known as Bumerang), starring Tony Ferrer
 Boomerang (1976 film), a French-Italian crime film
 Boomerang (1992 film), starring Eddie Murphy
 Boomerang (2001 film), a Serbian film
 Boomerang (2013 film), an American TV film starring Felicity Huffman
 Boomerang (2015 film), a French film
 Boomerang (2019 film), a Tamil film

Television
 Boomerang (Australian TV program), a 1961–1962 Australian television discussion program broadcast on GTV-9 in Melbourne
 Boomerang (TV network), a TV channel operated by Cartoon Network with various international versions:
 Boomerang (Australian and New Zealand TV channel)
 Boomerang (Central and Eastern Europe TV channel)
 Boomerang (Middle East and Africa TV channel)
 Boomerang (French TV channel)
 Boomerang (German TV channel), former TV channel
 Boomerang (Italian TV channel)
 Boomerang (Latin American TV channel)
 Boomerang (Scandinavian TV channel)
 Boomerang (Portuguese TV channel)
 Boomerang (Southeast Asian TV channel)
 Boomerang (South Korean TV channel)
 Boomerang (Spanish TV channel)
 Boomerang (Turkish TV channel)
 Boomerang (UK and Irish TV channel)
 Boomerang (American TV series), an American comedy television series from BET
 Boomerang, a Seattle-area kids' TV show hosted by Marni Nixon

Other
Boomerang: Travels in the New Third World, a 2011 nonfiction book by Michael Lewis
 Boomerang! (audio magazine), an audio magazine for kids
 Boomerang, an arcade game also known as Ikki
 Laramie Boomerang, a daily newspaper in Laramie, Wyoming

Music

Albums
 Boomerang (Betty Boo album), 2022
 Boomerang (The Creatures album), 1989
 Boomerang (Daara J album), 2003
 Boomerang (Hanson album), 2005
 Boomerang (Mad at the World album), 1991
 Boomerang (soundtrack), a soundtrack album from the 1992 film
 Boomerang (Stacey Q album), 1997

Songs
 "Boomerang" (Barenaked Ladies song), 2013
 "Boomerang" (Lali Espósito song), 2016
 "Boomerang" (DJ Felli Fel song), 2011
 "Boomerang" (The Grace song),  2006
 "Boomerang" (Nicole Scherzinger song), 2013
 "Boomerang" (JoJo Siwa song), 2016
 "Boomerang" (Wanna One song),  2018
"Boomerang", by Big Pun from Capital Punishment
"Boomerang", by Exo from The War: The Power of Music
"Boomerang", by Jana Kramer from Thirty One
"Boomerang", by Kiss from Hot in the Shade
"Boomerang", by Kix from Blow My Fuse
"Boomerang", by Plain White T's from Wonders of the Younger
"Boomerang", by Pigeon John in collaboration with 20syl
"Boomerang", by Relient K from Collapsible Lung
"Boomerang", a single by Kim Petras

Science
 BOOMERanG experiment, a sub-orbital experiment which studied the properties of cosmic microwave background radiation
 Boomerang Nebula, a nebula in Centaurus

Ships
 HMS Boomerang (1889)
 Boomerang (schooner), an operational 1903 schooner, part of the Sydney Heritage Fleet

Roller coasters
 Boomerang (roller coaster)
 Boomerang (Six Flags México)
 Boomerang (Six Flags St. Louis)
 Boomerang (Worlds of Fun)

Technology 
 Boomerang (countermeasure), a gunfire locator
 Boomerang (programming language)
 Boomerang, an Instagram app
 Maserati Boomerang, an automobile
 A controller for the PlayStation 3 games console

Other uses 
 Boomerang (cocktail), made with rye whiskey and Swedish Punsch
 Boomerang (horse) (1966–1983), show jumping horse
 Boomerang, Elizabeth Bay, a historic house in Australia
 The Boomerang, a weekly Australian newspaper published from 1887 to 1892
 Boomerang Festival, part of Byron Bay Bluesfest, an Australian music festival
 Color magazine (lighting), also called a boomerang, used to change the colors of a spotlight
 Flying Boomerangs, an Australian rules football team
 Boomerang Range, a narrow mountain range on the western side of the Skelton Glacier and Skelton Névé, Antarctica

See also 
 VPK-7829 Bumerang, a Russian Army armoured  personnel carrier